Egregor is the tenth studio album by the Serbian rock band Smak, released in 1999. It was released as CD. Egregore is, as it is stated  on album, "psychological and spiritual energy that we create together".

Track listing

Personnel 
 Dejan Najdanović "Najda" – vocals
 Radomir Mihailović "Točak" – guitar
 Mikica Milosavljević – guitar
 Sale Marković – bass
 Slobodan Stojanović "Kepa" and Dejan Stojanović Kepa Jr. – drums

External links

Smak albums
1999 albums
Serbian-language albums